Ivor Vice (23 July 1929 – 22 September 2005) was a British gymnast. He competed in eight events at the 1948 Summer Olympics.

References

1929 births
2005 deaths
British male artistic gymnasts
Olympic gymnasts of Great Britain
Gymnasts at the 1948 Summer Olympics
Sportspeople from Swansea